"Safe with Me" is a 2013 song by Sam Smith

Safe with Me may also refer to:
Safe with Me, 1979 album by Irma Thomas
"Safe with Me", song by Irma Thomas
"Safe with Me", song by Billie Piper from the album Walk of Life, 2000
"Safe with Me", song by Daron Jones
"Safe with Me", song by Morten Harket from Brother
"Safe with Me", song by Gryffin and Audrey Mika